Come Back Home is a 2022 South Korean comedy film directed by Lee Yeon-woo, starring Ra Mi-ran, Song Sae-byeok and Lee Beom-soo. The film follows an unknown comedian named Ki-se (Song Sae-byeok), who lost everything and returned to his hometown after 15 years, becoming the boss of a large organization. It was released on October 5, 2022.

Cast
 Ra Mi-ran as Yeong-shim
 Song Sae-byeok as Ki-se
 Lee Beom-soo as Kang Don 
 Lee Geung-young as Pal-chul 
 Oh Dae-hwan as Tae-kyu
 In Gyo-jin as Sang-man 
 Lee Jun-hyeok as Pil-seong
 Kim Won-hae as Seong-bong
 Lee Joong-ok as  Jun Cheol
 Special appearance
Kim Jun-ho 
Kim Ji-min
Kim Dae-hee

Production
Principal photography began on April 11, 2021 and filming was wrapped up on June 30, 2021.

Release
The film originally scheduled to release on September 21 was released on October 5, 2022.

Reception
Kang Nae-ri writing for YTN praised the performances of ensemble and stated, "It seems that such a dense story composition and a story that evokes sympathy has captured the actors as well." Concluding Kang opined, "The movie Come Back Home, full of laughter and emotion, is suitable for autumn."

References

External links
 
 
 

2022 films
2020s Korean-language films
South Korean comedy films